= Freiburger Puppenbühne =

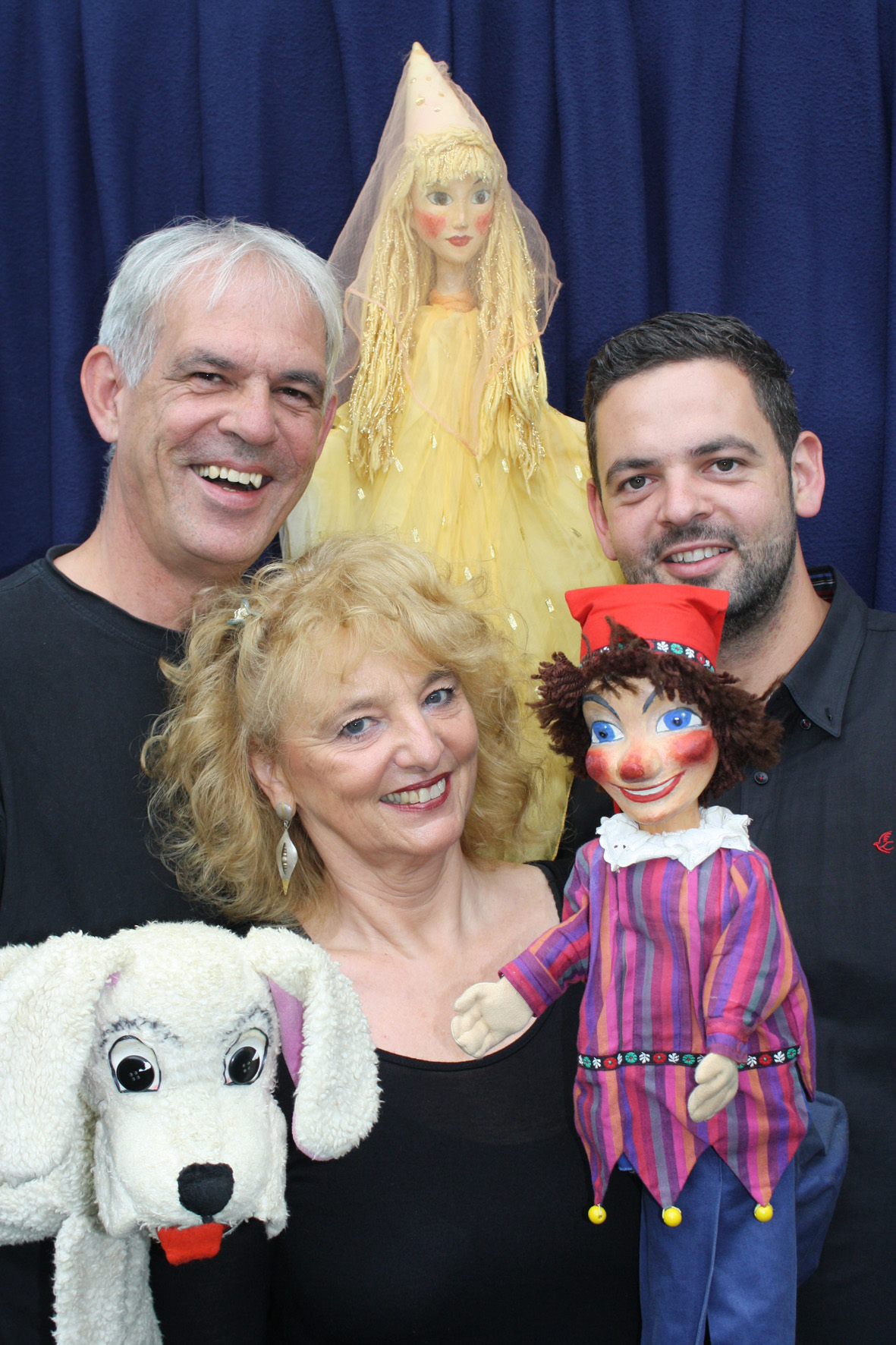
Freiburger Puppenbühne

Freiburger Puppenbühne is a puppet theatre company based in Baden-Württemberg, Germany.
